Premiere Wrestling Xperience (PWX) is an American independent professional wrestling promotion that is based in Charlotte, North Carolina.

History 

Founded in 2003 as Carolina Wrestling Association. Renamed in 2008 as Premiere Wrestling Showcase. From 2010 onwards it has been known as Premiere Wrestling Xperience.

Current roster

Alumni

Current champions

Tournaments

PWX Pure 

PWX Pure is a developmental promotion founded and run by PWX. Shows are monthly at Hebron Hall in Charlotte, NC. Cam Carter is the first PWX Pure champion, having won an 8-person tournament.

PWX Pure Champions

References

External links 
 
 http://www.pwxlive.com/

Independent professional wrestling promotions based in North Carolina
2003 establishments in North Carolina
Sports in North Carolina